The Internationalist Socialist Workers' Party (POSI) is a Spanish political party of trotskyist ideology founded in 1980. It is a member of the Fourth International (ICR).

References

1980 establishments in Spain
Communist parties in Spain
Fourth International (ICR)
Political parties established in 1980
Political parties in Spain
Trotskyist organisations in Spain